Here is a complete list for notable people who lived or from Tabriz:

 A 
Abu'l Majd Tabrizi, compiler of Safina-yi Tabriz, writer
Ahmad Hussein Adl, Minister of Agriculture
Akbar Alami, Representative of Parliament
Massoud Amin, American Engineer 
Taghi Arani, Iranian political activist; killed in prison in the First Pahlavi era
Armik
Aziz Asli, soccer player

 B 
Bagher Khan, Nationalist revolutionist
Mohammad Bagheri, current chief of staff of the Islamic Republic of Iran Armed Forces
Karim Bagheri, soccer player
Reza Baraheni, novelist, poet, critic and political activist, former president of Pen Canada
Mohammad Hossein Behjat Tabrizi (Shahriar), poet
Samad Behrangi, children's books writer
Qolam Hossein Bigjeh-Khani, musician and tar player
Gayk Bzhishkyan

 C 

 D 
Reza Deghati, photographer
Cyrus Dinmohammadi, soccer player

 E 
Hasan Enami Olya
Parvin E'tesami, poet

 F 
Javad Fakori, Major General; commander of the IRIAF during the Iran–Iraq War; served as Defense Minister
 Farhad Fakhredini, conductor of National Orchestra

 G 
Ivan Galamian
Azim Gheychisaz
 Vartan Gregorian, President of Carnegie Corporation

 H 
Ebrahim Hakimi, Prime Minister of Iran
Sattar Hamedani, soccer player
Hamid Mirza, heir presumptive of the Qajar dynasty
Mohsen Hashtroodi, mathematician
Homam-e Tabrizi, poet
Ahad Hoseini, painter

 I 
Iraj Mirza, poet and famous politician

 J 
Allameh Jafari, cleric, researcher
Feridoun Jam, Head of Iranian Army corps
Jafar Tabrizi, calligrapher
Mahmud Jam, Prime Minister of Iran
Rosa Jamali, poet, writer

 K 
Ahmad Kasravi, politician and author
 Samuel Khachikian, film director
Rasoul Khatibi, soccer player
Mohammad Khiabani, cleric; a political leader during Iran's Constitutionalist Revolution

 L 

 M 
Yadollah Maftun Amini, poet
Abu'l Majd Tabrizi, compiler of Safina-yi Tabriz; writer
Naser Manzuri, novelist, linguist
Tahmineh Milani, film director
Mir-Hossein Mousavi, Prime Minister of Iran, reformist

 N 
Reza Naji, actor
Nasimi, poet (however, there is a controversy about his birthplace)

 P 
Farah Pahlavi (Farah Diba), the last queen consort of Iran
Jafar Panahi, film director

 Q 
Abbas Mirza Qajar, prince, reformist
Ahmad Shah Qajar, King of Iran
Mohammad Ali Shah Qajar, King of Iran
Mohammad Shah Qajar, Shah of Persia of the Qajar dynasty
Naser al-Din Shah Qajar, King of Iran
Qalandar Tabrizi, speaker of bitter truths to power
Qatran Tabrizi, poet

 R 
Mirza Taqikhan Raf'at Tabrizi, poet, writer, founder of Raf'at Literary School
Hassan Roshdieh, founder of the first modern school in Iran

 S 
Kazem Sadegh-Zadeh
Gholamhossein Saedi, writer, novelist and political activist
Sattar Khan, Nationalist revolutionary leader
Seqat-ol-Eslam Tabrizi, Nationalist cleric
Shams Tabrizi, Sufi
Mohammad Kazem Shariatmadari, Grand Ayatollah
Jamileh Sheykhi, actress
Ali Soheili, Prime Minister of Iran

 T 
Allameh Tabatabaei, cleric, researcher
Javad Tabatabai,  political philosopher, historian, distinguished university professor
Maqsud Ali Tabrizi
Mir Ali Tabrizi, calligraphist
Mirza Abdul'Rahim Talibov Tabrizi, intellectual and social reformer
Muhammad ibn Muhammad Tabrizi, Muslim convert from Judaism; philosopher and translator
Hasan Taqizadeh, politician, diplomat and scholar
Varto Terian, Iran's first stage actress.

 V 
Fariba Vafi, novelist
Monir Vakili Nikjoo, opera singer

Tabriz
Tabriz
 
Tabriz